Benjamin Halfpenny (25 April 1906 – June 1966) was an English professional rugby league footballer who played in the 1920s and 1930s.

Playing career

International honours
Ben Halfpenny won a cap for England while at St. Helens in 1928 against Wales.

Ben Halfpenny was selected for Great Britain while at St. Helens for the 1928 Great Britain Lions tour of Australia and New Zealand.

Championship final appearances
Ben Halfpenny played right-, i.e. number 12, in St. Helens' 9-5 victory over Huddersfield in the Championship Final during the 1931–32 season at Belle Vue, Wakefield on Saturday 7 May 1932.

Challenge Cup Final appearances
Ben Halfpenny played right-, i.e. number 12, in St. Helens' 3–10 defeat by Widnes in the 1929–30 Challenge Cup Final at Wembley Stadium, London on Saturday 3 May 1930, in front of a crowd of 36,544.

County Cup Final appearances
Ben Halfpenny played right-, i.e. number 10, in St. Helens' 9-10 defeat by Warrington in the 1932 Lancashire County Cup Final during the 1932–33 season at Central Park, Wigan on Saturday 19 November 1932.

Club career
Ben Halfpenny made his début for Warrington on 26 January 1935, scored his only try for Warrington in the 18-5 victory over Leigh at Mather Lane (adjacent to the Bridgewater Canal), Leigh, and he played his last match for Warrington on 16 February 1935.

References

External links
Statistics at rugby.widnes.tv
Profile at saints.org.uk
Statistics at wolvesplayers.thisiswarrington.co.uk

1906 births
1966 deaths
England national rugby league team players
English rugby league players
Great Britain national rugby league team players
Rugby league centres
Rugby league locks
Rugby league players from Widnes
Rugby league props
Rugby league utility players
Rugby league wingers
St Helens R.F.C. players
Warrington Wolves players
Widnes Vikings players